Fair Play is a 2023 American erotic thriller film written and directed by Chloe Domont, in her feature directorial debut. It stars Alden Ehrenreich and Phoebe Dynevor as a young couple whose relationship starts to unravel following an unexpected promotion at a cutthroat hedge fund firm. Appearing in supporting roles are Sebastian de Souza, Eddie Marsan and Rich Sommer.

Fair Play premiered at the 2023 Sundance Film Festival on January 20, 2023. It will be distributed by Netflix.

Premise
The film charts the unraveling of a young couple's relationship following an unexpected promotion at a cutthroat hedge fund firm.

Cast
 Alden Ehrenreich as Luke 
 Phoebe Dynevor as Emily
 Eddie Marsan as Campbell 
 Sebastian de Souza
 Rich Sommer
 Geraldine Somerville
Source:

Production
The film was announced in December 2021, with Chloe Domont writing and directing the film, and Alden Ehrenreich and Phoebe Dynevor set to star in the film. Production began in January 2022 in Serbia. In February, with Sebastian de Souza, Eddie Marsan and Rich Sommer joining the cast.

Release
Fair Play premiered at the 2023 Sundance Film Festival on January 20, 2023. Shortly after, Netflix acquired distribution rights to the film for $20 million.

Reception

Critical Response
On the review aggregator website Rotten Tomatoes, Fair Play holds an approval rating of 90% based on 77 reviews with an average rating of 7.5/10. The website's consensus reads: "With assured style that's at times reminiscent of the best '90s nail-biting thrillers, Fair Play juxtaposes premarital disharmony with greed and gender politics in the cutthroat finance world." On Metacritic, which uses a weighted average, the film has a score of 76 out of 100, based on 18 reviews indicating "generally favorable reviews".

In his review for Variety magazine, Owen Gleiberman lauded Domont's screenplay and direction, as well the cast performances, writing that "Fair Play, while full of sex, money, corporate backstabbing, and a lot of other things that are fun to watch, really is a good little movie." Describing it as a "steamy, razor-wired, barking-mad movie" in his review for IndieWire, Ryan Lattanzio assigned the film a grade of A- and praised the screenplay and cast performances (particularly Ehrenreich's). Kevin Maher of the Times gave it a score of 4 out of 5, stating: "There’s something bracingly modern yet deliberately old-fashioned about this guilty pleasure thriller set in the aspirational world of Manhattan high finance."

References

External links

2023 thriller films
2023 directorial debut films
2023 independent films
2020s American films
2020s English-language films
2020s erotic thriller films
American erotic thriller films
Films about finance
Films shot in Serbia
Media Rights Capital films
Upcoming Netflix original films